Music & the Spoken Word is a religious radio and television series. Broadcast weekly from the Salt Lake Tabernacle in Salt Lake City, Utah, the program primarily features performances of music by The Tabernacle Choir at Temple Square—often accompanied by the Salt Lake Tabernacle organ and the Orchestra at Temple Square, accompanied by spiritual messages and passages related to a specific episode's theme (the "spoken word").

Music & the Spoken Word has been broadcast continually on the Salt Lake City-based KSL radio since 1929, making it the United States' longest-running national radio program carried continuously on a network. The program has received two Peabody Awards, and was inducted into the National Association of Broadcasters Broadcasting Hall of Fame in 2004, and the National Radio Hall of Fame in 2010. The program made its television debut in October 1949, and is currently the longest-running non-news program on television. It airs in syndication on television.

The radio program is distributed by the CBS Radio Network; its flagship station is KSL, which is owned by Bonneville International, a division of the Church of Jesus Christ of Latter-day Saints. KSL is a former CBS Radio affiliate; it switched to ABC Radio in 2005. The program is also heard on Sunday mornings over 50,000 watt KOA radio from Denver, also a former CBS Radio affiliate. In addition, it is currently broadcast by over 2,000 television and radio stations worldwide, including Bonneville International-owned KOIT-FM in San Francisco, KIRO-FM in Seattle-Tacoma, and KTAR-AM-FM in Phoenix.

History
The Tabernacle Choir at Temple Square's first network radio program, Music and the Spoken Word was first transmitted on July 15, 1929. The organ, choir, and announcer shared a single microphone that was attached to the ceiling of the tabernacle. The announcer stood on a ladder in order to speak into it. A telegraph was used to alert the sound engineer at KSL to start the broadcast. Anthony C. Lund was the director of the choir for the first program, and Earl J. Glade the general manager of KSL was the director and producer of the first program. Glade had been the moving force behind getting the program started.

In 2004, the program was inducted into the National Association of Broadcasters Radio Hall of Fame, in conjunction with its 75th anniversary on the air. It is one of only two radio programs to be so inducted, the other being the Grand Ole Opry.

The program was also inducted into the National Radio Hall of Fame in 2010.<ref>http://www.radiohof.org/ National Radio Hall Of Fame Retrieved on Nov. 06, 2010</ref>

Through early 2020, the program's continuous new weekly broadcasts led to it becoming the longest continuous weekly program in television and radio broadcasting history. In March 2020, as COVID-19 spread through Utah, adjustments were made to the weekly broadcast as a result. Among the adjustments were closing the Tabernacle to visitors, and airing encore presentations of previous broadcasts as the choir practices social distancing. The arrangement allows the Choir to continue the tradition of weekly broadcasts without putting its members, staff, or live audiences in danger during social distancing periods.

Broadcast

Each broadcast revolves around a specific theme  which is usually based on a religious and uplifting topic which have included family, hope, faith, Christmas, patriotism, joy, peace, kindness, etc., and are usually broadly Christian in application.

Music
The choir performs both sacred and secular pieces that correspond with the chosen message. In addition to hymns and sacred anthems, the choir has performed Broadway songs, such as "Climb Ev'ry Mountain" from The Sound of Music, patriotic American songs, such as "America the Beautiful", as well as a wide range of other selections. The broadcast also regularly features an organ solo played by one of the tabernacle organists.

On some occasions, special guests will also perform with the choir during the broadcast. These guests have included Renée Fleming, Frederica von Stade, Sissel, The King's Singers, Maureen McGovern and other well-known groups, musicians, news anchors, and actors.

Choir

The Grammy Award-winning Tabernacle Choir at Temple Square is a 360-voice choir that was founded in Utah in 1847, one month after the Mormon pioneers entered the Salt Lake Valley.

Called "America's Choir" by U.S. President Ronald Reagan, all members of the choir are volunteers and are not remunerated. The choir is led by director Mack Wilberg.

In addition to Music and & Spoken Word, the Choir performs regularly throughout the year, including an annual Christmas Concert, Pioneer Concert, and various other concerts as well providing music for the LDS General Conference. The choir has also been on national and international tours.

Orchestra

The Orchestra at Temple Square was created in 1999 in order to increase the aesthetic and musical quality of performances. The Orchestra frequently provides accompaniment for the weekly radio and TV broadcasts.

The Orchestra also undertakes its own concert season performing from standard orchestral literature, which has included Mahler's Symphony No. 4, the Firebird Suite by Stravinsky and Symphony No. 9 (from The New World) by Dvořák.

Like the Tabernacle Choir, the 110-member Orchestra is made up of volunteers, some of whom are also professional musicians.

Organ and organists

The organ in the Tabernacle is a very visible and notable part of the Tabernacle. The original organ was made by Joseph Harris Ridges (1827–1914), a native of Australia, and contained seven hundred pipes. However, the number of pipes is now 11,623, making the Tabernacle organ one of the world's largest pipe organs. The current organ is largely the work of G. Donald Harrison of the former Aeolian-Skinner organ firm. It was completed in the late 1940s. The organ has undergone a few minor modifications since that time.

Presently, the Tabernacle organ is played regularly by five main organists when accompanying the choir. Richard Elliott, Andrew Unsworth, and Brian Mathias are full-time organists, while Bonnie Goodliffe and Linda Margetts are part-time organists.

The "Spoken Word"
The announcer opens and closes the broadcast with an adaptation of Richard L. Evans's hallmark phrase, beginning with, "From the Crossroads of the West, we welcome you to Temple Square in Salt Lake City for Music and the Spoken Word with the Mormon Tabernacle Choir and Orchestra at Temple Square." The announcer introduces the music with information about the piece, or with short scriptural or literary passages. At some point, usually near the middle of the program, an inspirational spoken message is delivered. The quote, "Again we leave you, from within the shadows of the everlasting hills; may peace be with you, this day and always," signals the end of the program, and it is usually followed by the choir singing the hymn "God Be with You Till We Meet Again".

Announcers
Since its inception in 1929, the "spoken word" segment of the program has been voiced by three separate individuals. The original writer, producer, and announcer of the spoken portion of the broadcast was Richard L. Evans, who continued in that capacity for over forty years until his death in 1971. At that time the writing and announcing assignments were split, with a committee doing the writing. J. Spencer Kinard was the announcer from 1972 until he stepped down in 1990. Lloyd D. Newell has been the announcer from 1990 to the present.

Tabernacle

The program is broadcast from the Salt Lake Tabernacle, more commonly called the Mormon Tabernacle. The dome-shaped building was built between 1864 and 1867 on the west center-line axis of the Salt Lake Temple and is located inside Temple Square. The overall seating capacity of the building (since its renovation) is 7,000, which includes the choir area and balcony gallery. The central feature of the tabernacle is the large pipe organ.

Between 2005 and 2007, the program was temporarily housed in the Conference Center located across the street from Temple Square.

See also
 Mormon Channel – official LDS Church channel which rebroadcasts Music and the Spoken Word''
 List of longest-running United States television series

References

External links
 
 Current episode at the Tabernacle Choir website
 

1929 establishments in Utah
1929 radio programme debuts
1949 American television series debuts
1940s American television series
1950s American television series
1960s American television series
1970s American television series
1980s American television series
1990s American television series
2000s American television series
2010s American television series
2020s American television series
American Christian radio programs
American music radio programs
American music television series
Bonneville International
Tabernacle Choir
Television shows filmed in Utah
American religious television series
Television series about Christianity